Gunder Olson (September 8, 1852 – December 11, 1948) was a North Dakota public servant and politician with the Republican Party.

Biography
Gunder Olson was born in the county of Telemark, Norway. He came to America with his parents when he was only one year old, and his family located in Winneshiek County, Iowa. He came to North Dakota in 1881 and worked as a merchant. He served as the sheriff of Walsh County, North Dakota from 1884 to 1888. He also served as the president of the North Dakota Board of the Blind Asylum in Bathgate, now the North Dakota School for the Blind, in Grand Forks, North Dakota.

Olson was elected as the North Dakota State Treasurer in 1910 and served until 1914. He did not seek re-election to another term since Treasurers were not permitted to serve more than two consecutive terms.

Personal life
Gunder Olson was married and had two daughters. Olson died at the age of 96 in 1948. He is buried in the Grafton Lutheran Cemetery in Grafton, North Dakota.

See also
North Dakota State Treasurer
List of North Dakota State Treasurers

References

1852 births
1948 deaths
People from Telemark
Norwegian emigrants to the United States
North Dakota Republicans
State treasurers of North Dakota